Polwarth is a breed of sheep that was developed in Victoria (Australia) during 1880. They were of one-quarter Lincoln and three-quarters Merino bloodlines. They are large, predominantly polled sheep with long, soft, quite fine wool and produce good meat carcasses. They were developed in an attempt to extend the grazing territory of sheep because the Merino was found lacking in hardiness in this respect. A dual-purpose (meat and wool) breed with a major emphasis on wool production.
Richard Dennis, of Tarndwarncoort in south west Victoria, bred the Polwarth, first known as Dennis Comebacks. Descendants of Richards Dennis continue to grow Polwarth wool at Tarndwarncoort, maintaining the original bloodlines in a flock referred to as the "Blue Dots".

Wool
Polwarth wool is well regarded for its application in woolcraft. The longer staple length, up to 130mm, makes it easy for handspinning and felting. The wool is soft enough to wear against skin, and is known for its drape. Millspun yarns made solely of Polwarth wool are commercially available.

Polwarth sheep were developed with white wool; however, natural black, brown, grey wool flocks have expanded the popularity of Polwarth wool for craft.

Characteristics
Mature ewes weigh  and mature rams weigh . Ewes are excellent prime lamb mothers, producing lambs that have good lean carcasses. The high-yielding fleeces weigh an average six to seven kilograms, with a fibre diameter of 23 to 25 microns (58–60s).

Economy
The Polwarth Sheepbreeders' Association of Australia was formed in 1918 and the studbook closed in 1948.

Polwarths are now raised mostly in the higher rainfall regions of south-eastern Australia that have improved pastures. Polwarths have been exported into many countries, including South America, where they are known as Ideals. Polwarth and Corriedale form the main sheep breeds on the Falkland Islands.

References

External links
Polwarth Sheepbreeds Association of Australia

Sheep breeds originating in Australia
Sheep breeds